Spectacular!: Music from the Nickelodeon Original Movie is the soundtrack for the TV movie Spectacular!. The album was released on February 3, 2009 by Nickelodeon Records. The soundtrack was released in the UK on October 19 by Sony Music.

The album contains songs from the movie, such as "Don't Tell Me" by the show's headlining star, Nolan Gerard Funk. Other songs, such as "Something to Believe In" and "Everything Can Change", are sung by the whole cast. "Don't Tell Me" and "Everything Can Change" were released as promotional singles on November 11, 2008, and got music videos. The song “Eye of the Tiger” was also used for 2010 film 
Cats & Dogs: The Revenge of Kitty Galore

Commercial performance
The song "Break My Heart" peaked at number 95 on the Billboard Hot 100. On iTunes, the soundtrack hit the very top for bestselling soundtrack, if only for a short amount of time.

The majority of the soundtrack was written by Matthew Gerrard and Robbie Nevil.

Track listing

Charts

Weekly charts

Year-end charts

References

Television soundtracks
2009 soundtrack albums